Vladimíra Lesenská (born 28 May 1964) is a Czech politician who has served two terms in the Chamber of Deputies.

Lesenská is a civil engineer and graduated with a degree in engineering at the Czech Technical University in Prague. In 1994, she was elected as a municipal councilor for the Czech Social Democratic Party (CSSD) in Týniště nad Orlicí and held this position until 2016 when she left the party. She was also an MP in the Chamber of Deputies for the CSSD from 2006 to 2013 for the Hradec Králové region. In 2020, she joined the Freedom and Direct Democracy party and unsuccessfully stood for the party in the Senate. However, she stood in the 2021 Czech legislative election for the party and returned to the Chamber of Deputies. She is also the regional chairwoman of the SPD in Hradec Králové.

References 

1964 births
Living people
21st-century Czech politicians
Freedom and Direct Democracy MPs
Czech Social Democratic Party MPs
Members of the Chamber of Deputies of the Czech Republic (2006–2010)
Members of the Chamber of Deputies of the Czech Republic (2010–2013)
Members of the Chamber of Deputies of the Czech Republic (2021–2025)
Czech Technical University in Prague alumni
People from Opočno